Taenaris gorgo  is a butterfly in the family Nymphalidae. It was described by Theodor Franz Wilhelm Kirsch in 1877. It is endemic to New Guinea in the  Australasian realm

Subspecies
T. g. gorgo (New Guinea, Salawati Island, Sorong)
T. g. gorgophone  Fruhstorfer, 1904  New Guinea (Humboldt Bay, Finschhafef)
T. g. danalis  Fruhstorfer, 1904  (Waigeu)
T. g. mera  Fruhstorfer, 1905  (New Guinea: Afrak, Wangaar River)
T. g. ucina  Brooks, 1944  (New Guinea: Snow Mountains, Eilanden River)
T. g. yulei  Bakker, 1942  (Papua: Aroa River)
T. g. gorgias  Brooks, 1950  (New Guinea)

References

External links
Taenaris at Markku Savela's Lepidoptera and Some Other Life Forms

Taenaris
Butterflies described in 1877